Ieuan Rhys Williams (27 October 1909 – 1973) was a Welsh film, radio and television actor.

Career
He appeared in Fo a Fe, a Welsh sitcom, as Sioni the bartender; the television series Moulded in Earth (1965) as regular cast member John Ellis; and the drama film Under Milk Wood (1972) with the minor role of Gomer Owens.

He starred in a number of Welsh-language films, including Noson Lawen (1949).

See also

 Lists of actors
 List of Welsh people

References

External links
 

1909 births
1973 deaths
Date of death missing
20th-century Welsh male actors
Welsh male film actors
Welsh male radio actors
Welsh male television actors
Welsh-speaking actors